Bernardino Lanzani (1460-c. 1530) was an Italian painter of the Renaissance, active mainly in Pavia and Bobbio.

He is also known as Bernardino Colombano since he was born in San Colombano al Lambro. He was a pupil of Ambrogio da Fossano. He painted a triptych for the church of Santa Maria del Carmine, Pavia. He painted for the Abbey of San Colombano in Bobbio, and the church of San Teodoro in Pavia.

Sources

15th-century Italian painters
Italian male painters
Italian Renaissance painters
1460 births
16th-century deaths